Fernando de Souza Flexa Ribeiro (born September 12, 1945) is a Brazilian politician. He has represented Pará in the Federal Senate since 2005. He is a member of the Brazilian Social Democracy Party.

References

Living people
1945 births
Members of the Federal Senate (Brazil)
Brazilian Social Democracy Party politicians